Hangzhou Gymnasium is an indoor sporting arena located in Hangzhou, China.  The capacity of the arena is 5,136 spectators and opened in 1966.  It hosts indoor sporting events such as basketball and volleyball.  It hosts the Zhejiang Lions of the Chinese Basketball Association.

References

Indoor arenas in China
Sports venues in Zhejiang
Buildings and structures in Hangzhou
Basketball venues in China